Abacetus is a genus of beetles in the family Carabidae, distributed across Africa, Asia and Australia, with a single European species. It contains the following species:

 Abacetus abacillus Kolbe, 1898
 Abacetus aberrans Straneo, 1943
 Abacetus abor Andrewes, 1942
 Abacetus acutangulus Tschitscherine, 1903
 Abacetus aeneolus Chaudoir, 1869
 Abacetus aeneocordatus Straneo, 1940
 Abacetus aeneovirescens Straneo, 1939
 Abacetus aenescens Peringuey, 1896
 Abacetus aeneus Dejean, 1828
 Abacetus aenigma Chaudoir, 1869
 Abacetus aeratus Tschitscherine, 1900
 Abacetus afer Tschitscherine, 1899
 Abacetus alacer Peringuey, 1896
 Abacetus alaticollis Straneo, 1957
 Abacetus alesi Jedlicka, 1936
 Abacetus alluaudi Tschitscherine, 1899
 Abacetus amaroides Laferte-Senectere, 1853
 Abacetus ambiguus Straneo, 1969
 Abacetus amplicollis Bates, 1890
 Abacetus amplithorax Straneo, 1940
 Abacetus angolanus Straneo, 1940
 Abacetus angustatus Klug, 1853
 Abacetus angustior W.j.macleay, 1871
 Abacetus anjouaniananus (Straneo), 1973
 Abacetus annamensis (Tschitscherine, 1903)
 Abacetus anthracinus Tschitscherine, 1900
 Abacetus antiquus (Dejean, 1828)
 Abacetus antoinei Straneo, 1951
 Abacetus archambaulti Straneo, 1955
 Abacetus artus Andrewes, 1942
 Abacetus asmarensis Jedlicka, 1956
 Abacetus assiniensis Tschitscherine, 1899
 Abacetus ater W.J.Macleay, 1871
 Abacetus aterrimus Peringuey, 1896
 Abacetus atratus (Dejean, 1828)
 Abacetus atroirideus (Straneo), 1959
 Abacetus audax Laferte-Senectere, 1853
 Abacetus auratus (Straneo), 1949
 Abacetus australasiae Chaudoir, 1878
 Abacetus azurescens (Straneo), 1955
 Abacetus barbieri (Straneo), 1961
 Abacetus basilewskyi (Straneo, 1948)
 Abacetus batesi Andrewes, 1926
 Abacetus bechynei (Straneo, 1948)
 Abacetus belli Andrewes, 1942
 Abacetus bembidioides (Straneo), 1949
 Abacetus bequaerti Burgeon, 1934
 Abacetus bicolor (Straneo), 1971
 Abacetus bidentatus Andrewes, 1942
 Abacetus bifoveatus Straneo, 1963
 Abacetus bipunctatus (Motschulsky, 1864)
 Abacetus birmanus (Bates, 1890)
 Abacetus bisignatus Bates, 1890
 Abacetus blandus Andrewes, 1942
 Abacetus borealis Andrewes, 1942
 Abacetus bredoi Burgeon, 1934
 Abacetus brevicollis (Straneo), 1954
 Abacetus brevisternus (Straneo), 1951
 Abacetus brunneus (Straneo), 1939
 Abacetus cameronus Bates, 1886
 Abacetus candidus Andrewes, 1942
 Abacetus carnifer Andrewes, 1942
 Abacetus catalai (Jeannel, 1948)
 Abacetus catersi (Straneo), 1958
 Abacetus cavicola Straneo, 1955
 Abacetus ceratus Straneo, 1940
 Abacetus ceylandoides Straneo, 1953
 Abacetus ceylanicus (Nietner, 1858)
 Abacetus chalceus Chaudoir, 1869
 Abacetus chalcites Peringuey, 1896
 Abacetus chalcopterus Tschitscherine, 1900
 Abacetus claripes Straneo, 1949
 Abacetus collarti Straneo, 1948
 Abacetus communis Straneo, 1963
 Abacetus compactus Andrewes, 1942
 Abacetus complanatus Straneo, 1963
 Abacetus confinis (Boheman, 1848)
 Abacetus congoanus Burgeon, 1935
 Abacetus congoensis Tschitscherine, 1899
 Abacetus conradsi Straneo, 1939
 Abacetus contractus Chaudoir, 1876
 Abacetus convexicollis Straneo, 1949
 Abacetus convexiusculus Chaudoir, 1869
 Abacetus cordatissimus Straneo, 1941
 Abacetus cordatus Dejean, 1831
 Abacetus cordicollis Chaudoir, 1869
 Abacetus corvinus Klug, 1833
 Abacetus coscinioderus Chaudoir, 1876
 Abacetus crebrepunctatus Straneo, 1975
 Abacetus crenipennis Chaudoir, 1869
 Abacetus crenulatus Dejean, 1831
 Abacetus crenulicordatus Straneo, 1940
 Abacetus cribratellus Straneo, 1964
 Abacetus cribricollis (Dejean, 1831)
 Abacetus crinifer Tschitscherine, 1899
 Abacetus cuneatus (Fairmaire, 1887)
 Abacetus cuneipennis Straneo, 1961
 Abacetus cursor Peringuey, 1899
 Abacetus curtus Chaudoir, 1869
 Abacetus cyathoderus Chaudoir, 1869
 Abacetus cycloderus Andrewes, 1942
 Abacetus cyclomus Tschitscherine, 1903
 Abacetus dahomeyanus Straneo, 1940
 Abacetus dainellii Straneo, 1940
 Abacetus darlingtoni Straneo, 1984
 Abacetus decorsei Tschitscherine, 1901
 Abacetus dejeani (Nietner, 1858)
 Abacetus dekkanus Andrewes, 1942
 Abacetus delkeskampi Straneo, 1957
 Abacetus demoulini Straneo, 1963
 Abacetus denticollis Chaudoir, 1878
 Abacetus desaegeri Straneo, 1963
 Abacetus dilutipes Chaudoir, 1869
 Abacetus discolor (Roth, 1851)
 Abacetus disjunctus Andrewes, 1942
 Abacetus distigma Tschitscherine, 1899
 Abacetus distinctus Chaudoir, 1878
 Abacetus divergens Tschitscherine, 1899
 Abacetus diversus Peringuey, 1899
 Abacetus dorsalis (Motschulsky, 1866)
 Abacetus drimostomoides Chaudoir, 1869
 Abacetus duvivieri Tschitscherine, 1899
 Abacetus ellipticus Tschitscherine, 1898
 Abacetus elongatus Laferte-Senectere, 1853
 Abacetus elongellus Straneo, 1946
 Abacetus emeritus Peringuey, 1899
 Abacetus ennedianus Mateu, 1966
 Abacetus eous Andrewes, 1942
 Abacetus evulsus Peringuey, 1904
 Abacetus excavatus Straneo, 1949
 Abacetus exul Tschitscherine, 1900
 Abacetus feai Straneo, 1940
 Abacetus femoralis (Motschulsky, 1864)
 Abacetus fimbriatus Straneo, 1940
 Abacetus flavipes C.G.Thomson, 1858
 Abacetus foveifrons Bates, 1892
 Abacetus foveolatus Chaudoir, 1876
 Abacetus franzi Straneo, 1961
 Abacetus fraternus Tschitscherine, 1899
 Abacetus freyi Straneo, 1956
 Abacetus fulvomarginatus Straneo, 1956
 Abacetus furax Andrewes, 1936
 Abacetus fuscipes (Klug, 1833)
 Abacetus fuscorufescens Straneo, 1939
 Abacetus fuscus Straneo, 1941
 Abacetus gagates Dejean, 1828
 Abacetus gagatinus Chaudoir, 1869
 Abacetus ganglbaueri Tschitscherine, 1898
 Abacetus garavagliai Straneo, 1939
 Abacetus germanus Chaudoir, 1876
 Abacetus gimmanus Straneo, 1979
 Abacetus globulicollis Straneo, 1971
 Abacetus gondati Chaudoir, 1869
 Abacetus grandis Laferte-Senectere, 1853
 Abacetus guineensis Straneo, 1940
 Abacetus guttiger Andrewes, 1942
 Abacetus guttula Chaudoir, 1869
 Abacetus haemorrhous Chaudoir, 1878
 Abacetus haplosternus Chaudoir, 1878
 Abacetus hararinus Straneo, 1939
 Abacetus harpaloides Laferte-Senectere, 1853
 Abacetus hessei Straneo, 1940
 Abacetus hexagonus Straneo, 1992
 Abacetus hiekei Straneo, 1975
 Abacetus hirmocoeloides Straneo, 1949
 Abacetus hirmocoelus Chaudoir, 1869
 Abacetus hova Tschitscherine, 1899
 Abacetus hulstaerti Burgeon, 1935
 Abacetus humeratus Straneo, 1957
 Abacetus humilis Tschitscherine, 1903
 Abacetus idiomerus Tschitscherine, 1900
 Abacetus ifani Straneo, 1971
 Abacetus illuminans Bates, 1892
 Abacetus imerinae Tschitscherine, 1899
 Abacetus immarginatus Straneo, 1956
 Abacetus impressicollis (Dejean, 1828)
 Abacetus impunctus Andrewes, 1942
 Abacetus incertus Straneo, 1963
 Abacetus indrapoerae Tschitscherine, 1903
 Abacetus inexpectatus Kryzhanovskij & Abdurachmanov, 1983
 Abacetus infimus Tschitscherine, 1900
 Abacetus inopinus Peringuey, 1904
 Abacetus insolatus Bates, 1892
 Abacetus insularis Tschitscherine, 1900
 Abacetus intermedius Tschitscherine, 1899
 Abacetus iricolor Andrewes, 1936
 Abacetus iridescens Laferte-Senectere, 1853
 Abacetus iridipennis Fairmaire, 1868
 Abacetus ituriensis Straneo, 1956
 Abacetus jedlickai Straneo, 1963
 Abacetus johannae Straneo, 1961
 Abacetus kandaharensis Jedlicka, 1956
 Abacetus katanganus Burgeon, 1934
 Abacetus kivuanus Straneo, 1944
 Abacetus klickai Jedlicka, 1935
 Abacetus kochi Straneo, 1963
 Abacetus kordofanicus Tschitscherine, 1898
 Abacetus laevigatus Straneo, 1960
 Abacetus latemarginatus Straneo, 1940
 Abacetus latus Tschitscherine, 1898
 Abacetus lautus Peringuey, 1904
 Abacetus lecordieri Straneo, 1969
 Abacetus leistoides Bates, 1886
 Abacetus leleupi Straneo, 1951
 Abacetus leonensis Tschitscherine, 1899
 Abacetus leucotelus Bates, 1873
 Abacetus levisulcatus Straneo, 1939
 Abacetus liberianus Tschitscherine, 1899
 Abacetus longelytratus Straneo, 1951
 Abacetus longissimus Straneo, 1940
 Abacetus longiusculus Chaudoir, 1869
 Abacetus longulus Tschitscherine, 1900
 Abacetus loricatus Laferte-Senectere, 1853
 Abacetus lucidulus Peringuey, 1896
 Abacetus lucifugus Andrewes, 1924
 Abacetus luteipes Andrewes, 1942
 Abacetus mabalianus Straneo, 1956
 Abacetus macer Straneo, 1963
 Abacetus maculatus Straneo, 1949
 Abacetus madagascariensis (Dejean, 1831)
 Abacetus major Straneo, 1939
 Abacetus majorinus Peringuey, 1896
 Abacetus mameti Alluaud, 1933
 Abacetus mareei Straneo, 1951
 Abacetus marginatus Straneo, 1971
 Abacetus marginibasis Straneo, 1963
 Abacetus marginicollis Chaudoir, 1869
 Abacetus marshalli Straneo, 1940
 Abacetus mashunus Peringuey, 1896
 Abacetus mateui Straneo, 1959
 Abacetus mediopunctatus Straneo, 1951
 Abacetus melancholicus Laferte-Senectere, 1853
 Abacetus metallescens Tschitscherine, 1899
 Abacetus micans Straneo, 1951
 Abacetus michaelseni Kuntzen, 1919
 Abacetus micros Tschitscherine, 1899
 Abacetus minimus Straneo, 1940
 Abacetus minusculus Straneo, 1938
 Abacetus minutus (Dejean, 1831)
 Abacetus mirei Straneo, 1964
 Abacetus monardi Straneo, 1951
 Abacetus monardianus Straneo, 1952
 Abacetus mouffleti Chaudoir, 1876
 Abacetus mubalensis Straneo, 1958
 Abacetus multipunctatus Straneo, 1956
 Abacetus myops Straneo, 1959
 Abacetus nanus Chaudoir, 1869
 Abacetus natalensis Chaudoir, 1869
 Abacetus neghellianus Straneo, 1939
 Abacetus niger Andrewes, 1942
 Abacetus nigerrimus Straneo, 1948
 Abacetus nigrans Tschitscherine, 1901
 Abacetus nigrinus (Boheman, 1848)
 Abacetus nitens Tschitscherine, 1899
 Abacetus nitidulus Tschitscherine, 1900
 Abacetus nitidus Tschitscherine, 1900
 Abacetus notabilis Straneo, 1960
 Abacetus obesulus Straneo, 1940
 Abacetus oblongus Chaudoir, 1869
 Abacetus obscurus Andrewes, 1933
 Abacetus obtusus (Boheman, 1848)
 Abacetus occidentalis Tschitscherine, 1899
 Abacetus olivaceus Tschitscherine, 1900
 Abacetus optatus Andrewes, 1942
 Abacetus optimus Peringuey, 1904
 Abacetus orbicollis Straneo, 1988
 Abacetus oritoides Straneo, 1949
 Abacetus ornatus Tschitscherine, 1900
 Abacetus ovalis Straneo, 1940
 Abacetus overlaeti Burgeon, 1934
 Abacetus pallipes Chaudoir, 1869
 Abacetus parallelus Roth, 1851
 Abacetus parvulus (Klug, 1853)
 Abacetus patrizii Straneo, 1938
 Abacetus pavoninus Peringuey, 1899
 Abacetus perater Straneo, 1951
 Abacetus percoides Fairmaire, 1868
 Abacetus perplexus Peringuey, 1896
 Abacetus perrieri Tschitscherine, 1903
 Abacetus perturbator Peringuey, 1899
 Abacetus picescens Tschitscherine, 1900
 Abacetus picicollis Laferte-Senectere, 1853
 Abacetus picipes (Motschulsky, 1866)
 Abacetus picticornis Chaudoir, 1878
 Abacetus pictus Tschitscherine, 1900
 Abacetus piliger Chaudoir, 1876
 Abacetus pintori Straneo, 1940
 Abacetus planidorsis Straneo, 1949
 Abacetus planulus Straneo, 1940
 Abacetus poeciloides Straneo, 1949
 Abacetus politulus Chaudoir, 1869
 Abacetus politus Chaudoir, 1869
 Abacetus polli Straneo, 1949
 Abacetus pomeroyi Straneo, 1955
 Abacetus procax Tschitscherine, 1899
 Abacetus profundillus Straneo, 1943
 Abacetus promptus (Dejean, 1828)
 Abacetus protensus Chaudoir, 1876
 Abacetus proximus Peringuey, 1899
 Abacetus pseudangolanus Straneo, 1952
 Abacetus pseudoceratus Straneo, 1975
 Abacetus pseudoflavipes Straneo, 1939
 Abacetus pseudomashunus Straneo, 1950
 Abacetus pubescens Dejean, 1831
 Abacetus pullus Tschitscherine, 1899
 Abacetus pumilus (Boheman, 1848)
 Abacetus punctatellus Straneo, 1975
 Abacetus punctatostriatus Straneo, 1940
 Abacetus punctatosulcatus Chaudoir, 1869
 Abacetus punctibasis Straneo, 1940
 Abacetus puncticeps Straneo, 1963
 Abacetus puncticollis Straneo, 1951
 Abacetus punctulatus Straneo, 1960
 Abacetus pygmaeus Boheman, 1848
 Abacetus quadraticollis J.Thomson, 1858
 Abacetus quadratipennis W.J.Macleay, 1888
 Abacetus quadricollis Chaudoir, 1869
 Abacetus quadriguttatus Chaudoir, 1869
 Abacetus quadrinotatus Chaudoir, 1869
 Abacetus quadripustulatus Peyron, 1858
 Abacetus quadrisignatus Chaudoir, 1876
 Abacetus radama (Jeannel, 1948)
 Abacetus refleximargo Straneo, 1949
 Abacetus reflexus Chaudoir, 1869
 Abacetus rhodesianus Straneo, 1951
 Abacetus rotundicollis Straneo, 1951
 Abacetus rubidicollis (Wiedemann, 1823)
 Abacetus rubidus Burgeon, 1935
 Abacetus rubromarginatus Straneo, 1940
 Abacetus rufinus Straneo, 1943
 Abacetus rufipalpis Chaudoir, 1869
 Abacetus rufipes Laferte-Senectere, 1853
 Abacetus rufoapicatus Straneo, 1940
 Abacetus rufopiceus (Nietner, 1858)
 Abacetus rufotestaceus Chaudoir, 1869
 Abacetus rufulus (Motschulsky, 1866)
 Abacetus rugatinus (Csiki, 1930)
 Abacetus salamensis (KolbeKolbe), 1898
 Abacetus salzmanni Germar, 1824
 Abacetus seineri Kuntzen, 1919
 Abacetus semibrunneus Straneo, 1988
 Abacetus semiopacus Straneo, 1948
 Abacetus semotus Andrewes, 1942
 Abacetus senegalensis (Dejean, 1831)
 Abacetus servitulus Peringuey, 1904
 Abacetus setifer Tschitscherine, 1903
 Abacetus severini Tschitscherine, 1899
 Abacetus shilouvanus Peringuey, 1904
 Abacetus siamensis Chaudoir, 1878
 Abacetus silvanus Andrewes, 1942
 Abacetus simillimus Straneo, 1960
 Abacetus simplex Blackburn, 1890
 Abacetus sinuatellus Straneo, 1949
 Abacetus sinuaticollis Straneo, 1939
 Abacetus somalus Straneo, 1939
 Abacetus spinicollis Straneo, 1963
 Abacetus spissus Andrewes, 1937
 Abacetus spurius Tschitscherine, 1899
 Abacetus stenoderus (Motschulsky, 1866)
 Abacetus straneoi Basilewsky, 1946
 Abacetus strenuus Tschitscherine, 1899
 Abacetus striatus Chaudoir, 1869
 Abacetus subamaroides Straneo, 1964
 Abacetus subauratus Straneo, 1949
 Abacetus subdepressus Straneo, 1960
 Abacetus subflavipes Straneo, 1951
 Abacetus subglobosus Chaudoir, 1869
 Abacetus sublucidulus Straneo, 1949
 Abacetus submetallicus Nietner, 1858
 Abacetus subnitens Straneo, 1951
 Abacetus suboccidentalis Straneo, 1953
 Abacetus suborbicollis Straneo, 1965
 Abacetus subparallelus Straneo, 1940
 Abacetus subpunctatus Chaudoir, 1869
 Abacetus subrotundatus Straneo, 1951
 Abacetus subrotundus Straneo, 1959
 Abacetus subtilis Straneo, 1949
 Abacetus sudanicus Straneo, 1984
 Abacetus sulculatus Bates, 1892
 Abacetus tanakai Straneo, 1961
 Abacetus tanganjikae Tschitscherine, 1899
 Abacetus tenebrioides Castelnau, 1834
 Abacetus tenuimanus Tschitscherine, 1901
 Abacetus tenuis Laferte-Senectere, 1853
 Abacetus testaceipes (Motschulsky, 1864)
 Abacetus tetraspilus Andrewes, 1929
 Abacetus thoracicus (Jeannel, 1948)
 Abacetus thouzeti (Castelnau, 1867)
 Abacetus tibialis Chaudoir, 1878
 Abacetus tibiellus Chaudoir, 1869
 Abacetus transcaucasicus Chaudoir, 1876
 Abacetus trapezialis Straneo, 1949
 Abacetus trechoides Peringuey, 1896
 Abacetus treichi Alluaud, 1935
 Abacetus tridens Tschitscherine, 1899
 Abacetus trivialis Tschitscherine, 1899
 Abacetus trivialoides Straneo, 1951
 Abacetus ueleanus Burgeon, 1935
 Abacetus ukerewianus Straneo, 1940
 Abacetus unisetosus Straneo, 1939
 Abacetus usagarensis (Ancey, 1882)
 Abacetus usherae Straneo, 1962
 Abacetus vaccaroi Straneo, 1940
 Abacetus vadoni (Jeannel, 1948)
 Abacetus vanemdeni Straneo, 1939
 Abacetus vatovai Straneo, 1941
 Abacetus verschureni Straneo, 1963
 Abacetus vertagus Peringuey, 1904
 Abacetus vexator Peringuey, 1904
 Abacetus villiersi Straneo, 1951
 Abacetus villiersianus Straneo, 1955
 Abacetus virescens Straneo, 1940
 Abacetus vitreus Andrewes, 1942
 Abacetus voltae Tschitscherine, 1901
 Abacetus wakefieldi Bates, 1886
 Abacetus wittei Straneo, 1954
 Abacetus xanthopoides Straneo, 1951
 Abacetus xanthopus Tschitscherine, 1899
 Abacetus zanzibaricus Tschitscherine, 1898
 Abacetus zarudnyi Tschitscherine, 1901

References

 
Pterostichinae